Bradley Bourgeois (born April 13, 1994) is an American soccer player who plays for FC Tulsa in the USL Championship.

Career

Amateur
Bourgeois played four years of college soccer at the University of Tulsa from 2012 to 2015. He was a four-year letter winner, had seven goals and one assist for 15 points, started all 81 games of his career, was a three-time all-conference performer, and helped lead the team to three conference championships.

While at college, Bourgeois also appeared for Houston Dutch Lions and Tulsa Athletics.

Professional
On December 23, 2015, Bourgeois signed as a Homegrown Player with Houston Dynamo in Major League Soccer.

Bourgeois was sent on loan to Houston's United Soccer League affiliate club Rio Grande Valley FC Toros in March 2016.

He was released by Houston on June 14, 2016.

On December 14, 2017, Nashville SC announced the signing of Bourgeois.

After Nashville's move to MLS, Bourgeois was released and returned to USL Championship side FC Tulsa.

Career statistics

References

External links
 

1994 births
Living people
American soccer players
Association football defenders
Homegrown Players (MLS)
Houston Dutch Lions players
Houston Dynamo FC players
Nashville SC (2018–19) players
National Premier Soccer League players
People from Cypress, Texas
Rio Grande Valley FC Toros players
Soccer players from Texas
Sportspeople from Harris County, Texas
Tulsa Golden Hurricane men's soccer players
USL Championship players
USL League Two players
FC Tulsa players